Ptosima undecimmaculata, the Splendour beetle, is a species of beetles in the family Buprestidae.

Subspecies and varietas
 Ptosima undecimmaculata undecimmaculata Herbst, 1784
 Ptosima undecimmaculata metallescens Bílý, 1982
 Ptosima undecimmaculata var. sexmaculata Herbst

Description
The body is cylindrical and the head is much broader than long and narrower than the pronotum.

The Latin species name undecimmaculata indicates that the species should have eleven spots (lat. Undecimo = eleven, lat. Maculatus = stained). Normally the number of spots is different than eleven. This is due to the variety of spots in number, arrangement and form.

Pronotum  is black, with longitudinal stripes of rugosity. Elytra are black with three pairs of lateral, yellowish-orange or reddish transverse markings, frequently with preapical  maculae. Frons and pronotal  disc occasionally may have maculae.

Biology
Larvae develop for 2–3 years in wood of dead trees and bushes and in living branches of Prunus. Adults emerge in May–June.

Distribution
This widespread species is present in most of Europe, in the Near East and in North Africa.

Gallery

Bibliography
 Carl Gustav Calwer und Gustav Jäger (Herausgeber): C. G. Calwer's Käferbuch. K. Thienemanns, Stuttgart 1876, 3. Auflage
 H. Freude, K. W. Harde, G. A. Lohse: Die Käfer Mitteleuropas, Bd. 6. Spektrum Akademischer Verlag in Elsevier, München 1966, 
 H.Mühle, P.Brandl, M. Niehuis: Catalogus Faunae Graeciae; Coleoptera:Buprestidae Printed in Germany by Georg Rößle Augsburg 2000
 S. Bily, O.Brodsky "Taxonomical, biological and faunistical notes on Buprestidae and Cleridae from East Mediterrannean" Türk.Bit.Kor.Derg (1982) 6: 185-194

References

Buprestidae